Louise Victoria Hazel (born 6 October 1985) is an English track and field athlete from March, Cambridgeshire, who specialises in the multi-event heptathlon. She has competed in four major international championships. The first was in 2006 when she came 17th at the European Championships and the second was three years later when she finished 14th at the World Championships. During 2009 she was ranked 2nd best in the country and 9th best of all time. In the 2010 Commonwealth Games she won the gold medal for the England team, with a personal best of 6156 points. At the 2011 Mehrkampf-Meeting Ratingen she scored 6166 points but this included wind-assisted performances and she also competed at the 2012 Summer Olympics. In July 2012 she appeared with Tasha Danvers, Mark Foster, Derek Redmond on the Channel 4 programme Come Dine with Me prior to her Olympics competition, and won the show.

In September 2013 she announced her retirement from heptathlon, although she could compete in other events. In January 2014 she announced that she would come out of retirement to defend her title at the 2014 Commonwealth Games in Glasgow after Jessica Ennis-Hill announced that she would miss the Games due to pregnancy. However, in June 2014 Hazel stated that she had decided to abandon her comeback due to her training schedule being disrupted by a flare-up of ulcerative colitis.

Early life
Hazel was born in Southwark, London and enjoyed sports as a child. Encouraged by her father she began training at age 10 at the local athletics club. She was educated at Neale-Wade Community College in Cambridgeshire and graduated with a BA in French from the University of Birmingham. While at university she joined the renowned Birchfield Harriers Athletics Club.

Advocacy
Hazel is an ambassador for the British Heart Foundation.

Competition record

2010 Commonwealth Games

2011 World Championships

2012 Olympic Games

Other ventures
In 2015 Hazel competed on The Chase and a celebrity Christmas special edition of Ninja Warrior UK.

In 2017 Hazel appeared on a charity edition of MTVs The Challenge, titled The Challenge: Champs vs. Pros. She competed to raise money for Save the Children. In 2018, she returned to the MTVs The Challenge spinoff, titled The Challenge: Champs vs. Stars.

References

External links

 

1985 births
Living people
People from Southwark
People from March, Cambridgeshire
Sportspeople from Cambridgeshire
Athletes from London
British heptathletes
English heptathletes
Olympic heptathletes
Olympic athletes of Great Britain
Athletes (track and field) at the 2012 Summer Olympics
Commonwealth Games gold medallists for England
Commonwealth Games gold medallists in athletics
Athletes (track and field) at the 2010 Commonwealth Games
World Athletics Championships athletes for Great Britain
British Athletics Championships winners
Birchfield Harriers
Alumni of the University of Birmingham
The Challenge (TV series) contestants
Commonwealth Games competitors for England
Medallists at the 2010 Commonwealth Games